Geranium columbinum, common name long-stalked crane's-bill or longstalk cranesbill, is a herbaceous annual plant in the family Geraniaceae.

Description

The stem is more or less erect, hairy and quite branched. The leaves are opposite, approximately pentagonal and palmate and the leaf lobes have two to three deep cuts making it similar in shape to a pigeon's foot (hence the Latin epithet columbinus). The flowers are pink to purple,  in size, with five obovate-heart-shaped petals as long as the sepals. The petals are 7–9 mm long, with distinctive veining. The flowering period extends from March to September. The flowers are hermaphrodite and pollinated by insects (entomogamy).

Distribution
This plant is present throughout Europe, Western Asia and Northern Africa. It has also been introduced into North America.

Habitat

Gallery

References

  Acta Plantarum

External links 
 Biolib
 Geranium columbinum

columbinum
Plants described in 1753
Taxa named by Carl Linnaeus